Mursallı is a town in Germencik district of Aydın Province, Turkey. The town is situated to the south of Motorway O-31 which connects Aydın to İzmir. The population of the town was 1,144 as of 2012. According to town page, the name of the town refers to two brothers named Musa and Ali who founded the settlement during the Ottoman Empire era. Later Greeks also settled in the village. After the Population exchange agreement between Turkey and Greece, the Greeks left the village for Euboea island in the Aegean Sea and they named their new village as Neo Mursallı. (Recently the village in Euboea was renamed as Taxiarches referring to the name of the church in Mursallı.) According to the agreement Turkish families from Grevena in Greece were settled in Mursallı. There are also some Turkish families from Albania in Mursallı. In 1957, Mursallı was declared a seat of township.

References

Populated places in Aydın Province
Towns in Turkey
Germencik District